Shva may refer to:

Shva, a Hebrew diacritic
SHVA (Satellite Home Viewer Act), a set of regulations which govern the transmissions of television stations in the USA
Sheba, a kingdom mentioned in the Old Testament and the Qur'an (as pronounced in Modern Hebrew)